Countess Donelli (German: Gräfin Donelli) is a 1924 German silent drama film directed by G. W. Pabst and starring Paul Hansen, Henny Porten and Ferdinand von Alten. The film is considered to be lost. The film's sets were designed by the art director Hermann Warm.

Cast
 Paul Hansen as Graf Donelli
 Henny Porten as Mathilde, seine Frau
 Friedrich Kayßler as Graf Bergheim
 Eberhard Leithoff as Hellwig, Privatsekretär
 Ferdinand von Alten as Baron von Trachwitz
 Lantelme Dürer
 Karl Etlinger

See also
List of lost films

References

External links

Grafin Donelli at SilentEra

1924 films
1924 drama films
1924 lost films
German drama films
German silent feature films
German black-and-white films
Films directed by G. W. Pabst
Films of the Weimar Republic
Lost German films
Lost drama films
Silent drama films
1920s German films